Brandon James Keener (born October 1, 1974) is an American actor. He was born and raised in Fort Smith, Arkansas and graduated from University of Arkansas at Little Rock, where he won an Irene Ryan scholarship for collegiate actors and performed at the Kennedy Center.

Keener is best known for his voice-over roles in several video games, most notably that of former C-Sec officer Garrus Vakarian in the Mass Effect series, as well as ISAC from Tom Clancy's The Division, Detective Harold Caldwell in L.A Noire, and Tobias in Saints Row and Saints Row 2. He has also worked extensively in television and film. Keener has appeared in over 70 commercials, such as Skittles, Wink, BMW, FedEx, KFC, among many others.

Filmography

Film

Television

Video games

References

External links

1974 births
American male film actors
American male television actors
American male voice actors
Male actors from Arkansas
University of Arkansas alumni
Living people
People from Fort Smith, Arkansas